The Colt Model 1855 Sidehammer, also known as the Colt Root Revolver after engineer Elisha K. Root (1808–1865), was a cap & ball single-action pocketrevolver used during the American Civil War and made by the Colt's Patent Fire Arms Manufacturing Company

Calibers and variants 
In the revolver configuration of the patented revolving mechanism, only one model of the revolver was produced. Two calibers for the revolver were: .28 and .31. The production of the revolver started in 1855 and lasted until 1870. In spite of the complexity and ambition of its patented design, the Sidehammer revolver never reached the status of a popular gun.

Model series 
Production began in 1855 with the Model 1 followed by the Model 1A and then the Model 2 beginning with serial number "1" and ending in 1860 at about "25,000". These models had a roller-die engraved scene referred to as the "Cabin and Indian" scene. Production continued with the Model 3 which has a fluted cylinder

Barrels, cylinders 

The standard barrel length was 3-1/2 inches (4-1/2 inches for the Model 5A, 6A, and 7A). Calibers were .28 (Model 1 - 3). .31 (Models 3A, 4, 5, 6, 7). Octagon barrels (Model 1 - 4). Round barrels (Model 5 - 7).

The cylinder scene engraved on the first 25,000 pistols was created by banknote engraver Waterman Ormsby. The image was his fourth and last to be featured on Colt revolvers. The overall scene is 1-1/16 inch wide by 3-1/4 inch long. At one end of the scene is the text, "COLT'S PATENT No. [serial number]". The image contains a pioneer defending himself against an attack by six Indians in Seminole-style attire using a pair of revolver pistols while (presumably) his wife and child are escaping. Along the top of the scene (the edge of the cylinder which is closest to the pistol barrel) is a "finely detailed wavy line and dot border".

Models 3, 4, and 5 had a fluted cylinder (with indentations between the loading chambers), preventing the application of a continuously engraved scene. Some cylinders were decoratively hand-engraved.

Models 6 and 7 had a round cylinder, with the rolled-on "Stagecoach Holdup" scene by W. L. Ormsby.

Influences in later Colt firearms 
In 1855 the Sidehammer was the first Colt revolver to use the "creeping" loading lever. This loading mechanism was used again in 1860 in the design of the Colt Army Model 1860, the Colt Navy Model 1861, and the Colt Police Model 1862.

In 1855 the Sidehammer was the first Colt's solid-frame spur-trigger gun. This anatomical characteristic was taken again when the three models of the Colt Derringer started production in 1870. For the two first models production lasted in 1890, and the third model ended in 1912 (until it was re-released in the 1950s for western movies, under the name of the fourth model Colt Derringer). But in the Colt Derringers, the solid-frame spur-trigger design was still present in the patent when Colt's purchased the National Arms Company in 1870. Actual original Colt models subsequent to the Sidehammer and inheriting a solid frame and a spur trigger were the Colt House (1871) and the Colt New Line (1873).

The revolving mechanism of the cylinder was also used by Colt in the following long arms, in rifle and carbine configurations:

 Colt Model 1855 "First Model" Sporting Rifle
 Colt Model 1855 Half Stock Sporting Rifle
 Colt Model 1855 Full Stock Sporting Rifle
 Colt Model 1855 Military Rifle and Rifled Musket
 Colt Model 1855 Revolving Carbine
 Colt Model 1855 Revolving Shotgun

References 

American Civil War weapons
Black-powder pistols
Colt revolvers
Guns of the American West
Single-action revolvers